Paul Müller (born 21 January 1946) is a Swiss former gymnast. He competed in eight events at the 1968 Summer Olympics.

References

External links
 

1946 births
Living people
Swiss male artistic gymnasts
Olympic gymnasts of Switzerland
Gymnasts at the 1968 Summer Olympics
People from Lucerne-Land District
Sportspeople from the canton of Lucerne
20th-century Swiss people